Guangzhou Medical University (GMU, Chinese: 广州医科大学), formerly known as Guangzhou Medical College, is a Chinese medical school located in Guangzhou, China.

History 
It was established in 1958. The internship program began in 2013.

“Nan Yue Outstanding Graduate Student” campaign started in 1993 in Guangdong province.

Motto 
GMU's motto, chosen from Chinese is诚信务实，自强不息，敢为人先，追求卓越. The  motto is literally translated as “pragmatic integrity, self-discipline, always to be the first and pursuit of excellence”, and has been in use since the 1950s.

Academics

Students 
Approximately 1,500 undergraduates and 550 postgraduates (master and doctors) enroll from mainland China, Hong Kong and Macau each year. 23,300 students study full-time, including 10,000 undergraduates, 1,300 graduate students, and 12,000 continuing education students.
International students: 218 full-time undergraduates are studying MBBS in English medium, mostly from India and Nepal. Rest are from Tanzania, Bangladesh, Pakistan, Australia, France, Ghana, Cameroon, Comoros, United States, South Africa, Saint Vincent, Sudan, Uganda, Singapore, United Kingdom, Zambia, Sierra Leone, Equatorial Guinea, Mozambique, and other 21 countries

Campus 
Guangzhou Medical University has two campuses, Panyu and Yuexiu, covering an area of 372,300 square meters and a construction area of 481,900 square meters. There are 22 colleges, seven directly affiliated hospitals and 11 non-directly affiliated hospitals, and 28 research institutions.

Guangzhou Medical University has 20 research institutes:
Guangzhou Institute of Respiratory Diseases
The Sino-French Hoffmann Institute
Guangzhou Institute of Snake Venom
Institute of Neuroscience
Institute for Chemical Carcinogenesis
Cancer Research Institute
Institute of Humanities and Social Sciences 
Institute of Integrated Chinese and Western Medicine
Guangzhou Institute of Obstetrics and Gynecology
Guangzhou Institute of Cardiovascular Disease
Guangzhou Institute of Orthopedics 
Urology Institute and Institute of Higher Education

Academic programs 
Specialties include clinical medicine, medical examination, medical imaging, nursing, anesthesiology, stomatology, preventive medicine, pharmacy, therapeutic recreation, public service administration (PSA), biomedical engineering, psychotechnics, biotechnology, Chinese and Western integrative medicine, law, statistics, information management and systems, marketing management and food quality inspection.

Internship 
Physician internships run 48 weeks. Students apply for posts in the 8 affiliated hospitals of Guangzhou Medical University. Before the internship, students must pass to HSK 3 (Han Yu Shui Ping Kao Shi).

MBBS degree 
The university offers Bachelor of Medicine and Bachelor of Surgery degrees. Undergraduates who meet degree requirements receive a graduation certificate and a medical degree. Graduates can apply to take the medical licensing examination in order to  practice medicine. Some countries may require students to complete academic accreditation first.

Rankings and reputation

Nature Index 
Nature Index tracks the affiliations of high-quality scientific articles and presents research outputs by institution and country on monthly basis.

Times Higher Education (THE)

U.S. News & World Report Best Global Universities Ranking

CUAA (Chinese Universities Alumni Association) 
Universities Ranking of China released by CUAA (Chinese Universities Alumni Association, Chinese: 中国校友会网) is one of the most foremost domestic university rankings in China.

References

Educational institutions established in 1958
Universities in China with English-medium medical schools
1958 establishments in China
Universities and colleges in Guangzhou